Birmingham King's Norton was a constituency of the House of Commons of the Parliament of the United Kingdom from 1918 to 1955. It elected one Member of Parliament (MP) by the first-past-the-post system of election.

Boundaries 
The Representation of the People Act 1918 provided that the constituency was to consist of the "Northfield and Selly Oak Wards and the part of King's Norton Ward which is not included in the Moseley Division" in the County Borough of Birmingham.

The Representation of the People Act 1948 provided that the constituency was to consist of the "King's Norton and Moseley and King's Heath wards of the County Borough of Birmingham". Moseley and King's Heath wards had previously been part of the Birmingham Moseley and Birmingham Sparkbrook constituencies, as had the part of King's Norton ward which lay to the north of Bells Lane and to the east and south-east of the middle of Monyhull Hall Road and Brandwood Road. Northfield and Selly Oak wards became the constituency of Birmingham Northfield.

Members of Parliament

Election results

Elections in the 1910s

Elections in the 1920s

Elections in the 1930s

Elections in the 1940s

Elections in the 1950s

References 

Parliamentary constituencies in Birmingham, West Midlands (historic)
Constituencies of the Parliament of the United Kingdom established in 1918
Constituencies of the Parliament of the United Kingdom disestablished in 1955